Mike Dorsey (4 January 1930 – 24 October 2014) was an English-born Australian theatre and television actor and publicity officer and tour manager. 

Dorsey appeared in the TV series The Unloved, but was best known his television soap opera roles in Number 96 as Reginald "Daddy" McDonald, and The Young Doctors, as Sir Clifford Langley. he also played in the TV series Lockie Leonard.

Early life and career

Dorsey was born in Yorkshire, England. His acting career began in the late 1940s when he started acting with the Gate Theatre, Dublin, in bit parts. After three years in the army in the early 1950s Dorsey returned to acting, with several minor stage roles on the UK provincial theatre circuit. 

The scarcity of acting work led to a career change to the publicity business, and Dorsey subsequently did the publicity in London for such performers as Kenny Ball, Acker Bilk and The Yardbirds. He later did two tours with The Rolling Stones, one of which brought him to Australia where he decided to settle in 1965.

Television and film 

In Australia Dorsey's career as an actor and performer quickly took off. Beginning in the mid-1960s he had several guest starring roles in Australian drama series including Riptide, Skippy the Bush Kangaroo, and many appearances in the various Crawford Productions police drama series. During this period he also played the ongoing role of Captain Roke in the Australian Broadcasting Corporation-Artransa Film science fiction children's series Phoenix Five (1970), was the straight man on Joe Martin's show Tonight  on Channel Ten, and had a brief role as a police detective in Number 96 in 1972.

Beginning in January 1974 Dorsey played the regular role in serial Number 96 of comedy character Reginald P. MacDonald, often referred to by his wife and daughter as "Daddy". An officious bureaucrat with the local council, buttoned-down Reg lived a regimented life and liked to speak in acronyms as a sort of verbal shorthand. He would frequently register his indignation with signature phrase "Great Scott!" Along with wife Edie – otherwise known as "Mother" or "Mummy" – (Wendy Blacklock) and daughter Marilyn (Frances Hargreaves) the character became a hit with viewers.

In late 1976 there were plans to spin off the characters of Mummy and Daddy into a new situation comedy series titled Mummy and Me and starring Dorsey and Blacklock, but the proposed series was not picked up by the network and the characters remained in Number 96. Dorsey and Blacklock played in Number 96 continuously until it ended in August 1977, surviving several drastic cast purges during the show's closing months.

After the series ended, Dorsey, like many of his former Number 96 co-stars, had a guest starring role in school-based drama Glenview High (1977). In the late 1970s Dorsey and his main Number 96 co-star Wendy Blacklock created a stage show based on their Number 96 characters which toured clubs in New South Wales over a period of nearly two years. 

In 1978–1979 Dorsey played an ongoing role on hospital-based soap opera The Young Doctors. He then took the regular role of Vic Marshall in Network Ten daily soap opera Arcade (1980), a notorious critical and popular failure cancelled after being on air only six weeks. Dorsey subsequently ran a theatrical group.

After not appeared in roles since 1990, Dorsey was cast in 2007 in the role of 'Pop' in the children's television series 'Lockie Leonard', filmed in Western Australia, in which he played the role of Lockie's grandfather. He portrayed the role in the first and second series as a recurring character, but not actively as a main role.

Personal life
On 18 April 2010, Mike married his lifelong partner, Pamela Borain, at their property in Baldivis, where they lived until he died peacefully aged 84 at Rockingham General Hospital on Friday 24 October 2014.

Filmography

References

External links

1930 births
English male stage actors
English male television actors
Male actors from Yorkshire
Australian male television actors
2014 deaths
English emigrants to Australia
Australian Army personnel
Military personnel from Yorkshire